Faisal Buressli - (born November 6, 1961 in Manama, Bahrain) is a Kuwaiti former basketball player and current coach.

References
Exclusive Q&A with Kuwait National team Head coach, Faisal Buressli. A true legend in his country

1961 births
Kuwaiti men's basketball players
Basketball coaches
Sportspeople from Manama
Living people
21st-century Kuwaiti people